The 2005 WNBA season was the seventh for the Minnesota Lynx. The Lynx missed the playoffs for the first time in three years. It also marked the final season for original franchise superstar Katie Smith, as she was traded to the Detroit Shock during the season.

Offseason

WNBA Draft

Regular season

Season standings

Season schedule

Player stats

References

External links
Lynx on Basketball Reference

Minnesota Lynx seasons
Minnesota
Minnesota Lynx